Goeppertia gandersii (syn. Calathea gandersii) is a species of flowering plant in the Marantaceae family. It is endemic to Napo Province of Ecuador. Its natural habitats are subtropical or tropical moist lowland forests and subtropical or tropical moist montane forests.

References

gandersii
Flora of Ecuador
Vulnerable plants
Taxonomy articles created by Polbot
Taxobox binomials not recognized by IUCN